Olive Marjorie Senior (born 23 December 1941) is a Jamaican poet, novelist, short story and non-fiction writer based in Toronto, Ontario, Canada. She was awarded the Musgrave Gold Medal in 2005 by the Institute of Jamaica for her contributions to literature.

Life and career

Born in rural Jamaica in Trelawny, Cockpit Country, Olive Senior was the seventh of 10 children. She attended Montego Bay High School for Girls. At 19, she joined the staff of the Jamaica Gleaner in Kingston and later worked with the Jamaica Information Service. Senior later won a scholarship to study journalism at the Thomson Foundation in Cardiff, Wales, and as a Commonwealth scholar attended Carleton University School of Journalism in Ottawa, Ontario, Canada.

While at university, she began writing fiction and poetry. On her return to Jamaica, she worked as a freelancer in public relations, publishing, and speech writing, before joining the Institute of Social and Economic Research at the University of the West Indies, where she edited the journal Social and Economic Studies (1972–77). In 1982, she joined the Institute of Jamaica as editor of the Jamaica Journal.

In 1987, Senior won the Commonwealth Writers' Prize for her first collection of stories, Summer Lightning. After Hurricane Gilbert hit Jamaica in 1988, Senior moved to Europe, where she lived in Portugal, the Netherlands, and the United Kingdom, before settling in Toronto, Ontario, Canada, in the early 1990s.

In 2019, she was awarded the Matt Cohen Award by the Writers' Trust of Canada in honour of her career as a writer.

Literary works

Senior has published four collections of poems: Talking of Trees (1985), Gardening in the Tropics (1994), Over the Roofs of the World (2005) and Shell (2007). Her short story collection Summer Lightning (1986) won the Commonwealth Writers' Prize; it was followed by Arrival of the Snake Woman (also includes "The Two Grandmothers", which is one of her best short stories) (1989, 2009) and Discerner of Hearts (1995). Her most recent collection of stories, The Pain Tree (2015), was the overall winner of the 2016 OCM Bocas Prize for Caribbean Literature, having won the fiction category.

Her first novel, Dancing Lessons (Cormorant Books, 2011), was shortlisted for the 2012 Commonwealth Book Prize in the Canada region.

Her non-fiction works include The Message Is Change (1972), about Michael Manley's first election victory; A-Z of Jamaican Heritage (1984, expanded and republished as Encyclopedia of Jamaican Heritage in 2004); and Working Miracles: Women's Lives in the English-Speaking Caribbean (1991).

Senior's most recent non-fiction book, Dying To Better Themselves: West Indians and the Building of the Panama Canal, was published in September 2014 – 100 years after the opening of the Panama Canal, 15 August 1914. On 1 April 2015 the book was shortlisted for the 2015 OCM Bocas Prize for Caribbean Literature, winning the non-fiction category.

An extended critical evaluation of Senior's work can be found in Olive Senior by Denise deCaires Narain (2011), published by Northcote House Publishers (UK) in collaboration with the British Council as part of the Writers and Their Work series.

Senior's work often addresses questions of Caribbean identity in terms of gender and ethnicity. She has said: "I've had to deal with race because of who I am and how I look. In that process, I've had to determine who I am. I do not think you can be all things to all people. As part of that process, I decided I was a Jamaican. I represent many different races and I'm not rejecting any of them to please anybody. I'm just who I am and you have to accept me or not."

Her work has been adapted as drama and broadcast by the BBC and CBC, and she also wrote the radio play Window for the CBC. Her writing features in a wide range of anthologies including Her True-True Name (eds Elizabeth Wilson and Pamela Mordecai, 1989), Daughters of Africa (ed. Margaret Busby, 1992), The Heinemann Book of Caribbean Poetry (eds Ian McDonald and Stewart Brown, 1992), Concert of Voices: An Anthology of World Writing in English (ed. Victor J. Ramraj, 1994), The Year's Best Fantasy and Horror Tenth Annual Collection (eds Ellen Datlow and Terri Windling, 1997), The Wadsworth Anthology of Poetry (ed. Jay Parini, 2005), Best Poems on the Underground (eds Gerard Benson, Judith Chernaik and Cicely Herbert, 2010), So Much Things to Say: 100 Calabash Poets (2010), and numerous others.

Senior's work is taught in schools and universities internationally, with Summer Lightning and Gardening in the Tropics in particular being used as educational textbooks.

Translations
Recent translations include: ZigZag, translated into French by Christine Raguet, Geneva: Zoe, 2010; Eclairs de chaleur, translated into French by Christine Raguet, Geneva: Zoe, 2011, Depuis la Terrasse et autres nouvelles (translated into French by Marie-Annick Montout), special edition, Mauritius: L'Atelier d'écriture, 2011; Zomerweerlicht (trans. Marie Luyten), Netherlands: Ambo/Novib, 1991; Das Erscheinen der Schlangenfrau (trans. Wolfgang Binder) Germany: Dipa/Verlag, 1996, and Unionsverlag, 2003; a Book Club Selection, The Berne Declaration, Switzerland, 1996.

A bilingual (English and French) book of Senior's poetry, Un Pipirit M'a Dit/A Little Bird Told Me, was released in 2014.

Gardening in the tropics, translated into Arabic by Mamoun Zaidei, published by NCCAL. KWAIT.2017

Selected awards and honours

1987: Commonwealth Writers' Prize, for Summer Lightning and Other Stories
1988: Silver Musgrave Medal
1994: Hawthornden Fellow, Scotland
1994–: Dana Distinguished Professor of Creative Writing and International Education, St. Lawrence University, Canton, NY 
1995: F. G. Bressani Literary Prize for Gardening in the Tropics
2003: Norman Washington Manley Foundation Award for Excellence (preservation of cultural heritage – Jamaica) 
2004: Gold Musgrave Medal of the Institute of Jamaica
2005: Humanities Scholar, University of the West Indies, Cave Hill, Barbados
2005: Over the Roofs of the World shortlisted for the Governor-General's Literary Award for Poetry
2005: Runner-up for the Casa de las Américas Prize
2006: Shell shortlisted for the Pat Lowther Award 
2006: Ontario Arts Council and Canada Council works-in-progress grants
2011: Dancing Lessons shortlisted for the Amazon.ca First Novel Award, the Commonwealth Book Prize
2011: Isabel Sissons Canadian Children's Story Award
2015: OCM Bocas Prize for Caribbean Literature, winner of non-fiction category
2016: OCM Bocas Prize for Caribbean Literature, winner of fiction category and overall winner

Selected bibliography
Poetry
Talking of Trees, Calabash, 1986
Gardening in the Tropics, McClelland & Stewart, 1994
Over the Roofs of the World, Insomniac Press, 2005 
Shell, Insomniac Press, 2007
Hurricane Watch, Carcanet Press, 2022

Short stories
Summer Lightning and Other Stories, Longman, 1986. 
Arrival of the Snake-Woman, Longman, 1989. (Includes The Two Grandmothers). 
Discerner of Hearts, McClelland & Stewart, 1995. 
The Pain Tree, Cormorant, 2015. 

Novels
Dancing Lessons, Cormorant Books, 2011. 

Children's literature
Birthday Suit, Annick Press, 2012
Anna Carries Water, Tradewind, 2013
Boonoonoonous Hair, Tradewind, 2019

Non-fiction
The Message Is Change: A Perspective on the 1972 General Elections, Kingston Publishers, 1972.
Pop Story Gi Mi (four booklets on Jamaican heritage for schools), Ministry of Education (Kingston, Jamaica), 1973.
A-Z of Jamaican Heritage, Heinemann and Gleaner Company Ltd, 1984.
Working Miracles: Women's Lives in the English-Speaking Caribbean, Indiana University Press, 1991.
Encyclopedia of Jamaican Heritage, Twin Guinep, 2004.
Dying To Better Themselves: West Indians and the Building of the Panama Canal, University of the West Indies Press, 2014.

References

Interviews in the Jamaica Gleaner:
 Laura Tanna, "One-on-one with Olive Senior (Pt. II)", 31 October 2004.
 Laura Tanna, "One-on-one with Olive Senior (Part 3)", 7 November 2004.

External links
 Olive Senior's website.
 Video of Olive Senior Reading and Conversation on Monday, Feb. 8, 2016 in the Digital Library of the Caribbean
 "NAW Interview with Olive Senior", New Asian Writing, 15 September 2014.
 "Olive Senior: 'Should Literature Be Political?'" Keynote speech delivered by Olive Senior at the Edinburgh World Writers' Conference: Trinidad.
 A brief selection of poems by Olive Senior, in audio format and read by her, is available via the website of The Poetry Archive.

1941 births
Living people
20th-century Canadian poets
20th-century Canadian short story writers
20th-century Canadian women writers
20th-century Jamaican novelists
20th-century Jamaican poets
21st-century Canadian novelists
21st-century Canadian poets
21st-century Canadian short story writers
21st-century Canadian women writers
21st-century Jamaican novelists
21st-century Jamaican poets
Black Canadian women
Black Canadian writers
Canadian people of Jamaican descent
Canadian women novelists
Canadian women poets
Canadian women short story writers
Jamaican short story writers
Jamaican women novelists
Jamaican women poets
Jamaican women short story writers
People associated with the University of the West Indies
Recipients of the Musgrave Medal
Writers from Toronto